Mary Cooper (d. August 5, 1761) was an English publisher and bookseller based in London who flourished between 1743 and 1761. With Thomas Boreman, she is the earliest publisher of children's books in English, predating John Newbery.

Cooper's business was on Paternoster Row. She was the widow of printer and publisher Thomas Cooper, whose business she continued. Thomas Cooper had published a reading guide in 1742, The Child's New Play-thing, and his wife published an edition of it after his death. Active from 1743 to 1761, she is notable especially for publishing Tommy Thumb's Pretty Song Book (1744), "the first known collection of English nursery rhymes in print". Cooper collected the rhymes, each of which had a companion woodcut, and later critics have remarked that "Cooper's ear for a good jingle was unerring".

With her husband, she was a trade publisher, meaning she did not own the copyright to works they published, meaning also that the actual copyright owner could remain anonymous, a benefit when the book was controversial—one of the Coopers' books was the (anonymously printed) erotic novel A Secret History of Pandora's Box (1742). As such, Cooper had business arrangements with Andrew Millar, Henry Fielding's publisher, and  printed a number of Fielding's pamphlets. She was an exception to the general rule that 18th-century women in the publishing business were of only minor importance; besides functioning as a trade publisher she owned the copyright to a number of titles. She is also credited with publishing a newspaper, the Manchester Vindicated, remarked on in 1749.

References

1761 deaths
Publishers (people) from London
English booksellers
18th-century English businesswomen
18th-century English businesspeople
Year of birth unknown